is a former Japanese football player.

Playing career
Yoshioka was born in Mie Prefecture on June 6, 1972. He played for Yokohama Flügels. He debuted in March 1994 and played several matches in 1994 season. Although he played several matches in 1995 too, he could not play many matches. In 1996, he moved to Gamba Osaka. However he could not play at all in the match and retired end of 1996 season.

Club statistics

References

External links

1972 births
Living people
Association football people from Mie Prefecture
Japanese footballers
J1 League players
Yokohama Flügels players
Gamba Osaka players
Association football midfielders